Pleuroncodes is a genus of squat lobsters in the family Munididae, containing the following species:
 Pleuroncodes monodon (H. Milne Edwards, 1837)
 Pleuroncodes planipes Stimpson, 1860

References

External links

Squat lobsters
Decapod genera
Taxa named by William Stimpson